Drew Pearson is a Grammy-nominated American songwriter, producer, and multi-instrumentalist.

Selected songwriting discography

Selected production discography

Awards and nominations
Grammy Awards
Grammy Award for Best Song Written for Visual Media – "Where The River Goes" by Zac Brown Band (Nominated)
Juno Awards
Pop Album of the Year – Little Machines by Lights (Won)
Pop Album of the Year – Party For Your Life by Down With Webster (Nominated)

References

Year of birth missing (living people)
Living people
Songwriters from Ohio
Record producers from Ohio